Albert Burgess may refer to:
 Albert Franklin Burgess, American entomologist
 Sonny Burgess (1929–2017), American musician
 Cam Burgess (1919–1978), English footballer